In 2015, there were 33 new This American Life episodes.

 air date: 2015-01-09
 Act 1: Batman Begins.
 Act 2: The Dark Knight Rises.

 air date:  2015-01-23
 Act 1: Ask Not for Whom The Bell Trolls; It Trolls for Thee. 
 Act 2: Freedom Fries.
 Act 3: Words of Prey.
 Act 4: Mailer Demon.

 air date:  2015-01-30
 Act 1: Burroughs, Part One. 
 Act 2: Burroughs, Part Two.

 air date:  2015-02-06
 Act 1: 
 Act 2:

 air date:  2015-02-13
 Act 1: Inconvenience Store.
 Act 2: Comey Don't Play That.

 air date:  2015-02-27
 Act 1: Theater of War.
 Act 2: And Baby Makes 0011.
 Act 3: Commander In Brief.

 air date:  2015-03-13
 Act 1: 
 Act 2: 

 air date:  2015-03-20
 Act 1: Takes One To Know One.
 Act 2: Heels On The Bus.
 Act 3: No Man Left Behind.
 Act 4: The Test.

 air date:  2015-03-27
 Act 1: Full Disclosure.
 Act 2: Total Eclipse of the Son.
 Act 3: The Favorite.

 air date:  2015-04-03
 Act 1: Do You Hear What I Hear?
 Act 2: Sunrise, Sun-Get.
 Act 3: Contrails of My Tears.

 air date:  2015-04-10
 Act 1: Como Se Dice "Not It"?
 Act 2: Last But Not Least.
 Act 3: The Big Crapple.

 air date:  2015-04-24
 Act 1: Do Ask, Do Tell.
 Act 2: Crime Pays.
 Act 3: Glacial Change

 air date:  2015-05-01
 Act 1: Dream Weevil.
 Act 2: Smell You Later.
 Act 3: The Haunter Becomes the Haunted.
 Act 4: Overnight Flight.

 air date:  2015-05-15
 Act 1: Some Like it Not (On the Neck).
 Act 2: If You See Racism Say Racism.
 Act 3: About that Farm Upstate.

 air date:  2015-05-29
 Act 1: 200 Dog Night, featuring Blair Braverman.
 Act 2: Funny Face.
 Act 3: Who Put the Face in Game Face?
 Act 4: Frankly Miss Scarlet.

 air date:  2015-06-26
 Act 1: Cookies and Monsters.
 Act 2: Romancing the Phone.
 Act 3: A Quiet Street in Richmond.
 Act 4: A Brief History of Us.

 air date:  2015-07-03
 Act 1: 
 Act 2: 

 air date:  2015-07-17
 Act 1: 
 Act 2:

 air date:  2015-07-31
 Act 1: The Problem We All Live With PART ONE. 
 Act 2: The Problem We All Live With PART TWO.

 air date:  2015-08-07
 Act 1: My Secret Public Plan. 
 Act 2: What’s It All About, Arne?

 air date:  2015-08-14
 Act 1: But Wait, There's More!
 Act 2: Pink Slip.

 air date:  2015-08-28
 Act 1: First Stop.
 Act 2: Second Stop.
 Act 3: Third Stop.
 Act 4: Fourth Stop.
 Act 5: Fifth Stop.
 Act 6: Sixth Stop.

 air date:  2015-09-11
 Act 1: Overboard.
 Act 2: The Lyin' Kings.

 air date:  2015-09-18
 Act 1: I Can Explain.
 Act 2: RSV-Pa.

 air date:  2015-10-02
 Act 1: I Am The Eggplant.
 Act 2: I Always Feel Like Somebody's Watching Me.
 Act 3: The Big Break.

 air date:  2015-10-09
 Act 1: The Room Where It Happens.
 Act 2: The Wedding Crasher.
 Act 3: Drivers Wanted. Really Really Wanted.

 air date:  2015-10-16
 Act 1: The Night.
 Act 2: The Morning.

 air date:  2015-10-30
 Act 1: Jesse’s Girl.
 Act 2: My Love Is Blue.
 Act 3: Unbreak My Heart.

 air date:  2015-11-06
 Act 1: Optimus, Way Past Her Prime.
 Act 2: Streetwise.
 Act 3: Richard Pierce.
 Act 4: Trailbreaker.

 air date:  2015-11-29
 Act 1: Finding the Self in Selfie.
 Act 2: Mon Ami Ta-Nehisi.
 Act 3: There Owes the Neighborhood.
 Act 4: 76-Year-Old Quarterback Throws Hail Mary Pass.

 air date:  2015-12-11
 Act 1: Frank Sinatra Has a Cold.
 Act 2: One Sinatra Fan ... Versus All Of Network TV.
 Act 3: History Lesson.
 Act 4: The Death of Frank Sinatra.
 Act 5: Chairman of the Block.

 air date: 2015-12-18
 Act 1: Guerrilla Marketing
 Act 2: Not Our Town
 Act 3: The Spy Who Didn't Know She Was A Spy.
 Act 4: Party On!

 air date: 2015-12-25
 Act 1: Christmas On A High Wire.
 Act 2: Oily Potter and The Gobble of Fire.
 Act 3: The First Noel.

References

External links
This American Lifes radio archive for 2015

2015
This American Life
This American Life